Abra's at-large congressional district refers to the lone congressional district of the Philippines in the province of Abra. Abra has been represented in the country's various national legislatures since 1898. The first congressional delegation consisted of two members in the First Philippine Republic legislature known as the Malolos Congress. Since 1919 when it was re-established as a regular province separate from Ilocos Sur, Abra has been entitled to one member in the House of Representatives of the Philippines, elected provincewide at-large, except for a brief period between 1943 and 1944 when it was again represented by two members in the National Assembly of the Second Philippine Republic. From 1978 to 1984, all provinces were converted into multi-seat regional at-large districts for the Interim Batasang Pambansa of the Fourth Philippine Republic, with Abra forming part of the twelve-seat Region I's at-large district. It was restored as a single-member district in 1984.

The district is currently represented in the 19th Congress by Menchie Bernos of the Nacionalista Party (NP).

Representation history

Election results

2022

2016

2013

2010

See also 
 Legislative district of Abra

References 

Congressional districts of the Philippines
Politics of Abra (province)
1898 establishments in the Philippines
1917 establishments in the Philippines
At-large congressional districts of the Philippines
Congressional districts of the Cordillera Administrative Region
Constituencies established in 1898
Constituencies disestablished in 1901
Constituencies established in 1917
Constituencies disestablished in 1972
Constituencies established in 1984